Macrocheilus spectandus is a species of ground beetle in the subfamily Anthiinae. It was described by Peringuey in 1904.

References

Anthiinae (beetle)
Beetles described in 1904